Gezira is an island in the Nile, in central Cairo, Egypt. The southern portion of the island contains the Gezira district, and the northern third contains the Zamalek district.

Gezira is west of downtown Cairo and Tahrir Square, connected across the Nile by four bridges each on the east and west sides, the Qasr El Nil Bridge, 15 May Bridge, Al-Gala'a Bridge and 6th October Bridge. Under 19th century ruler Khedive Ismail the island was first called "Jardin des Plantes" (French for "Garden of Plants"), because of its great collection of exotic plants shipped from all over the world.

Landmarks 
 Cairo Tower (1960), the tallest concrete structure in Egypt, built near the Gezira Sporting Club.
 Egyptian Opera House (1988), built near the Cairo Tower.
 El Sawy Culture Wheel Centre (2003), located beneath 15 May Bridge in Zamalek, one of the most important cultural venues in Egypt.
 Gezira Sporting Club (1882), the oldest club in Egypt.
 Al Ahly SC main branch, founded in 1907 by Omar Lotfi as a gathering place for student unions against the British Occupation.

Education
Schools on the island include:
 Lycée Français du Caire Zamalek Primary Campus
 Pakistan International School Cairo in Zamalek
 Previously, the British International School in Cairo (BISC) in Zamalek

Sports
Gezira Island is home to the basketball club Al Gezira Cairo, 2017 Champion of the Egyptian Basketball Super League.

Al Ahly SC is located on Gezira island.

Gallery

See also
 Zamalek district

References

External links 
 
 

 
Districts of Cairo
Geography of Cairo
Islands of the Nile
River islands of Egypt